Pavement, in construction, is an outdoor floor or superficial surface covering. Paving materials include asphalt, concrete, stones such as flagstone, cobblestone, and setts, artificial stone, bricks, tiles, and sometimes wood. In landscape architecture, pavements are part of the hardscape and are used on sidewalks, road surfaces, patios, courtyards, etc.

The term pavement comes from Latin pavimentum, meaning a floor beaten or rammed down, through Old French pavement. The meaning of a beaten-down floor was obsolete before the word entered English.

Pavement, in the form of beaten gravel, dates back before the emergence of anatomically modern humans. Pavement laid in patterns like mosaics were commonly used by the Romans.

Paver

A paver is a paving stone, tile, brick or brick-like piece of concrete commonly used as exterior flooring. In a factory, concrete pavers are made by pouring a mixture of concrete and some type of coloring agent into a mold of some shape and allowing to set. They are generally placed on top of a foundation which is made of layers of compacted stone and sand. The pavers are placed in the desired pattern and the space between pavers is then filled with a polymeric sand. No actual adhesive or retaining method is used other than the weight of the paver itself except edging. Pavers can be used to make roads, driveways, patios, walkways and other outdoor platforms.

Concrete pavers

An interlocking concrete paver is a type of paver. This special type of paver, also known as a segmental paver, has emerged over the last couple of decades as a very popular alternative to brick, clay or concrete. An interlocker is a concrete block paver which is designed in such a way that it locks in with the next paver. The locking effect allows for a stronger connection between pavers and with this interlocking effect the paving itself is resistant to movement under traffic.

Segmental pavers have been used for thousands of years.  The Romans built roads with them that are still there.  But it was not until the mid-1940s that pavers began to be produced out of concrete.  It started in the Netherlands where all the roads are made to be flexible because the country is below sea level and the ground shifts, moves and sinks. Poured concrete is not an option because it will crack.  Individual units not set in concrete, and placed in sand perform far better than concrete.  Before the paver was made from concrete, either real stone or a clay product was used.

The first production of concrete pavers in North America was in Canada, in 1973. Due to their success, paving stone manufacturing plants began to open throughout the United States working their way from East to West.

The first concrete pavers were shaped just like a brick, 4” by 8” (10 cm x 20 cm) and they were called Holland Stones. These units turned out to be economical to produce and were exceedingly strong.

In addition to being economical, interlocking concrete pavers are also widely available in water-permeable designs, which have added ecological benefits. By allowing water to drain through the pavers in a way that mimics natural absorption, builders and landscapers are able to limit surface runoff and prevent soil erosion or buildup of standing water in the surrounding land area. Some permeable paver installations are designed to harvest rainwater, which can then be repurposed for uses such as irrigation or washing a car.

Stone pavers
A stone paver is another type of paver. This type of paver is used widely in building and landscaping as it is highly prized for beauty, strength and durability. Stone pavers are made of many materials including limestone, bluestone, basalt (such as that from The Palisades used in New York City), sandstone and granite.

Travertine is a durable, low-porous stone that stays cool in direct sunlight, making it a popular choice for pool-sides, patios, walkways and outdoor entertainment areas. Travertine is salt tolerant and has a low sunlight reflection. Granite pavers have high integral strength and density making it easy to maintain and hard-wearing in outdoor use. Limestone pavers are cut from natural limestone blocks, a sedimentary rock found in mountainous areas and ocean sea beds. Limestone tends to have unique natural colour variations. Sandstone pavers are derived from natural stone and tend to be used for sidewalks, patios and backyards.

Pavement and urban environment
Impermeable asphalt and concrete pavements prevent water from passing into the ground. This creates excess runoff that can worsen flooding, especially in heavily-paved urban areas.

Permeable pavers can be used to prevent excess runoff, but have lower compressive strength, ravelling, segregation and difficulty in compaction.

See also
 Macadam
 Permeable paving
 Hoggin
 Pavement (York)

References

External links

 
Building materials
Concrete
Floors
Garden features